Stizocera jamaicensis is a species of beetle in the family Cerambycidae. It was described by Vitali in 2007.

References

Stizocera
Beetles described in 2007